Orlestone Forest is a  biological Site of Special Scientific Interest south of Ashford in Kent. It is a Nature Conservation Review site, Grade I.

This site is described by Natural England as "an important invertebrate locality of national significance". Hundreds of invertebrate species have been recorded, including 39 which are nationally rare and 134 which are nationally scarce. Several are only known in Britain on this site.

A road and footpath go through the site.

References

External links

Sites of Special Scientific Interest in Kent
Nature Conservation Review sites
Sites of Special Scientific Interest notified in 1989
Forests and woodlands of Kent